Kang Chol-ryong (born 20 June 1990) is a North Korean former footballer. He represented North Korea on at least one occasion in 2010.

Career statistics

International

References

1990 births
Living people
People from Haeju
North Korean footballers
North Korea international footballers
Association football defenders
Sobaeksu Sports Club players
Rimyongsu Sports Club players